Hakea recurva subsp. arida is a plant in the family Proteaceae endemic to the south-west of Western Australia.

Description
They may be straight or have an upward curve. Profuse white-cream fragrant flowers appear in dense clusters in the leaf axils.

Taxonomy and naming
This hakea was first formally described in 1904 by Ludwig Diels who gave it the name Hakea arida and published the description in Botanische Jahrbücher für Systematik, Pflanzengeschichte und Pflanzengeographie. In 1999, William Barker and Robyn Barker changed the name to Hakea recurva subsp. arida. Named from the Latin aridus - dry, referring to the semi-arid area where it grows.

Distribution and habitat
Grows inland from Mount Augustus south to Wubin on sandstone slopes, river banks, flats in sand, loam and stony soils with quartzite and laterite. An ornamental frost tolerant species requiring full sun and good drainage. A good habitat plant for wildlife due to its dense prickly growth habit.

Conservation status
Hakea recurva subsp. arida is classified as "not threatened" by the Western Australian Government Department of Parks and Wildlife.

References

recurva
Eudicots of Western Australia
Plants described in 1904
Plant subspecies
Taxa named by William Robert Barker